Thomas Langton "Tommy" Church (1873 – February 7, 1950) was a Canadian politician.

After serving as Mayor of Toronto from 1915 to 1921, he was elected to the House of Commons of Canada in the 1921 election as a Conservative from the riding of Toronto North. He was defeated in the 1930 election in Toronto West Centre, but returned to Parliament as Member of Parliament (MP) for Toronto East in a 1934 by-election. He remained in the House of Commons until his death in 1950.

As mayor, Church was strongly backed by the Toronto Telegram and opposed by the Toronto Daily Star. He was occasionally mocked in the pages of the Star by Ernest Hemingway who was, at the time, a reporter for the paper. Late in his career as an MP, Church denounced the newly formed United Nations as "modern tower of Babel", for "which Canada and Great Britain should not allow their interests to be the play thing."

In the House of Commons in June 1936, he protested against the requirement of bilingual banknotes in the Bank of Canada Act for banknotes to be introduced as the 1937 Series, stating there was no authority for it in the British North America Act, and that it had not been an issue during the 1935 federal election. He favoured printing dual-language banknotes (distinct English and French banknotes) as had been done for the 1935 Series. He was also a member of the Orange Order in Canada.

Notes

References

External links
 
Thomas Langton Church fonds, Archives of Ontario

1870 births
1950 deaths
Conservative Party of Canada (1867–1942) MPs
Mayors of Toronto
Members of the House of Commons of Canada from Ontario